Akhkhazu is a female demon from the Akkadic mythology. Her Sumerian name is Dimme-kur. She is also called "the seizer".

She brings fever and plagues and is a member of a trio of female demons (Labasu, Labartu, Akhkhazu). Despite the fact the word "Akhkhazu" has a male gender, Akhkazu is often described as having a female nature.

Source: Birth in Babylonia and the Bible. From the Cuneiform Monographs, Authors = Martin Stol, inc. chapter by F.A.M. Wiggerman; Styx Publications, Groningen, (c) 2000.

Mesopotamian legendary creatures
Female legendary creatures
Evil deities